Albert Thomas Alsbury (21 April 1904 – 21 July 1990) was a Canadian politician, educator, and soccer player. He served as the 29th mayor of Vancouver, British Columbia from 1959 to 1962 and was a goalkeeper in the Pacific Coast League from the 1920s through to the early 1940s.

Alsbury was born in Edinburgh, Scotland after which he moved to Vancouver in 1907. He studied education at the University of British Columbia, where he received a degree. He was later a vice-principal at Grandview High School of Commerce in Vancouver, before the school and himself were relocated to Vancouver Technical Secondary School.

Alsbury defeated Frederick Hume by 11,000 votes to become mayor. He left this office after 1962 and then worked for the University of British Columbia, although by that time his policies led to the loss of support from the Non-Partisan Association.

As Mayor in 1959, Alsbury helped kick off the new Pacific Coast Soccer League season at Callister Park.

He formed the senior citizen advocacy group Pensioners for Action Now in 1972.
Tom enjoyed playing sports, athletic & a very strong swimmer. Fluent in 3 languages. He always encouraged furthering education, had a strong bond with his wife Mildred, children and 6 grandchildren.

References

External links
 Vancouver History: list of mayors, accessed 26 August 2006

1904 births
1990 deaths
Scottish educators
Scottish footballers
Scottish politicians
Politicians from Edinburgh
Scottish emigrants to Canada
Association football goalkeepers
University of British Columbia Faculty of Education alumni
Mayors of Vancouver
Academic staff of the University of British Columbia
20th-century Canadian politicians